Lukáš Paukovček (born 13 November 1990) is a Slovak professional ice hockey player who currently playing for Vlci Žilina of the Slovak 1. Liga.

Career statistics

Regular season and playoffs

References

External links

1990 births
Living people
Sportspeople from Liptovský Mikuláš
Slovak ice hockey forwards
MHk 32 Liptovský Mikuláš players
HK Poprad players
HK Nitra players
HK Dukla Trenčín players
HC '05 Banská Bystrica players
MsHK Žilina players